Dominic Tacadina Gadia (born 18 January 1986) is a Guamanian footballer who plays as a defender for Table 35 Espada.

References

Living people
1986 births
People from Hagåtña, Guam
Guamanian footballers
Guam international footballers
Quality Distributors players
Association football defenders
Guamanian football managers